The Oklahoma City Oklahoma Temple is the 95th operating temple of the Church of Jesus Christ of Latter-day Saints (LDS Church).  It serves stakes in Oklahoma, Arkansas, and Kansas.

The Oklahoma City Oklahoma Temple was announced on March 14, 1999, to be built on land purchased years earlier for the building of a meetinghouse, along with an additional parcel of land donated by the sellers. The additional land was originally used as a baseball field by local church members. 

The temple groundbreaking took place on July 3, 1999 in Oklahoma City, Oklahoma. The temple open house began on July 15, 2000 with over 40,000 visitors touring the temple in a seven-day period. James E. Faust, second counselor in the First Presidency, dedicated the Oklahoma City Oklahoma Temple on July 30, 2000.  It was constructed at a cost of $4.5 million.

On April 10, 2017 the LDS Church announced that the temple would close in October 2017 for renovations that would be completed in 2019. On January 16, 2019, the LDS Church announced that the temple would be rededicated on May 19, 2019. While the church originally announced there would be no open house, an update on 22 April indicated there would be an open house from April 24 to May 1, excluding Sunday. The temple was rededicated by Henry B. Eyring.

In 2020, the Oklahoma City Oklahoma Temple was closed in response to the coronavirus pandemic.

See also

 Comparison of temples of The Church of Jesus Christ of Latter-day Saints
 List of temples of The Church of Jesus Christ of Latter-day Saints
 List of temples of The Church of Jesus Christ of Latter-day Saints by geographic region
 Temple architecture (Latter-day Saints)
 The Church of Jesus Christ of Latter-day Saints in Arkansas
 The Church of Jesus Christ of Latter-day Saints in Oklahoma

References

Additional reading

External links
 
Oklahoma City Oklahoma Temple Official site
 Oklahoma City Oklahoma Temple at ChurchofJesusChristTemples.org

20th-century Latter Day Saint temples
Buildings and structures in Canadian County, Oklahoma
Latter Day Saint movement in Oklahoma
Religious buildings and structures in Oklahoma
Temples (LDS Church) completed in 2000
Temples (LDS Church) in the United States
2000 establishments in Oklahoma